Steven Meisel (born June 5, 1954) is an American fashion photographer, who obtained popularity and critical acclaim with his work in Vogue and Vogue Italia as well as his photographs of friend Madonna in her 1992 book, Sex. He is now considered one of the most successful fashion photographers in the industry. He used to work regularly for both US and Italian Vogue, and W (at the time also published by Condé Nast) and now exclusively for British Vogue.

Early life
Meisel studied at the High School of Art and Design, where he attended different courses but, as affirmed in an interview with Ingrid Sischy for Vogue France, he finally majored in fashion illustration.

From an early age, Meisel had a deep interest for fashion; he often preferred to sketch models while looking at fashion magazines rather than play with other things and soon enough attended the High School of Art and Design in New York City. Later, he was admitted at the Parsons School of Design, where he majored in fashion illustration and graduated.

Career
Meisel taught illustration part-time at his alma mater, Parsons School of Design. Later on, while working at Women's Wear Daily as an illustrator, he went to Elite Model Management where Oscar Reyes, a booker who liked his illustrations, allowed him take pictures of some of their models. 

He would photograph them in his apartment in Gramercy Park or on the street: on weekdays he would work at Women's Wear Daily and on weekends with the models. One was future film star Phoebe Cates. Some of these models went to castings for Seventeen magazine to show their portfolios, which held some of his photography, and the people at Seventeen subsequently called Meisel and asked if he wanted to work with them.

Meisel worked for many different fashion magazines, most notably Interview and US and Italian Vogue. From July 1988 to May 2015, he photographed every single cover (with a few exceptions in 1989), and the main fashion story of Italian Vogue, and then half of the covers by year until the farewell issue of editor Franca Sozzani in March 2017, naming his last shoot "Buy, Bye". In 2014, he portrayed 50 models for the 50th anniversary of Vogue Italia.

Meisel has contributed photos for the covers of several popular albums and singles, including two RIAA Diamond-certified albums, Madonna's 1984 album Like a Virgin and Mariah Carey's 1995 album Daydream. His work can be seen on the cover of Madonna's single "Bad Girl" (a nude), the limited picture disc for Madonna's UK single release of "Fever" (a partial nude), and Mariah Carey's single "Fantasy" (simply a different crop of the photo on the cover of the Daydream album). He also directed the music video for Deborah Harry's single "Sweet and Low" alongside fashion designer Stephen Sprouse.

Fashion campaigns
Meisel has shot campaigns for Versace, Valentino, Dolce & Gabbana, Louis Vuitton, Balenciaga and Calvin Klein. Since 2004, Meisel has shot Prada campaigns each season. In April 2008, he shot friend Madonna for Vanity Fair, and later that year he shot her for the 2009 spring campaign by Louis Vuitton.

He is a close friend of designer Anna Sui, for whom he has also shot several campaigns, even though Sui rarely uses advertising to promote her clothing.

Influence
As one of the most powerful photographers in the fashion industry, Meisel is credited with "discovering" or promoting the careers of many successful models, including Linda Evangelista, Guinevere Van Seenus, Karen Elson, Amber Valletta, Kristen McMenamy, Stella Tennant, Raquel Zimmerman, Saskia de Brauw, Sasha Pivovarova, Jessica Stam, Naomi Campbell, Christy Turlington, Lexi Boling, Iris Strubegger, Lara Stone, Coco Rocha, Natalia Vodianova, Vanessa Axente, and Elise Crombez.

Meisel often creates layouts which are controversial, by juxtaposing fashion and politics and/or social standards. Provocative photoshoots in Vogue Italia earned him accusations of being tasteless and tactless. For example, in the September 2006 issue of Vogue Italia''', Meisel played with the concept of restricted liberties post-September 11 America, with the models portraying terrorists and highly trained policemen. It caused a stir in the press, as the models were presented in violent compositions where they could be seen as being victimized. It elicited a negative response from many feminists which saw the role of the women as being undermined by their male counterparts. The July 2008 issue of Vogue Italia featured only black models, and was entirely photographed by Meisel. 

It was a response to increasing criticism of racism in the fashion industry and became the best-selling issue in the magazine's history. When asked about the issue, Meisel said: "Obviously I feel that fashion is totally racist. The one thing that taking pictures allows you to do is occasionally make a larger statement. After seeing all the shows though I feel it was totally ineffective. I was curious—because it received a lot of publicity—whether it would have any effect on New York, London, Paris, or Milan, and I found that it did not. They still only had one token black girl, maybe two. It’s the same as it always was and that’s the sad thing for me."

A book collecting some of his photographs, titled Steven Meisel, was published by German teNeues Buchverlag in 2003 and sold out.

In 2014–2015, Phillips held an exhibition called "Role Play" that featured some of the photographic work of Meisel throughout the years, and which took place in the cities of Paris, London, New York, and Miami.

Personal life

Meisel is notorious for rarely giving interviews or being photographed. However, in one of few cases, he was interviewed by Ingrid Sischy for Vogue Paris. The following year, Meisel agreed to be interviewed for 032c magazine by Pierre-Alexandre de Looz. De Looz's piece, "Who Is Steven Meisel?", was accompanied by a 14-page fold-out retrospective of Meisel's 20 years of covers for Vogue Italia''.

References

External links
 Portfolio at Art+Commerce Agency

1954 births
20th-century American Jews
21st-century American Jews
American photographers
Fashion photographers
High School of Art and Design alumni
Living people
Parsons School of Design alumni
People from Gramercy Park